Landfermann-Gymnasium (LfG) is situated in the city centre of Duisburg, Germany. It is a municipal grammar school for boys and girls, and is one of the oldest schools in Germany.

Founded before 1280 as Schola Duisburgensis, the school was transformed into a Latin school in 1559, which today's Landfermann-Gymnasium acknowledges as its official founding year. In 1925 it was renamed after Dietrich Wilhelm Landfermann (1800–1882), who was head of the school from 1835-1841.

See also 
 , minor planet

References 
 

Schools in North Rhine-Westphalia
Educational institutions established in the 1550s
1559 establishments in the Holy Roman Empire
Duisburg